The following is a list of mayors of the city of Manaus, in Amazonas state, Brazil.

 , 1890 
 José Carlos da Silva Telles, 1890-1891	
 , 1891	
 Leonardo Antônio Malcher, 1891	
 Raimundo Pinto Brandão, 1891-1892	
 Manoel Antônio Grangeiro, 1892-1893	
 Manoel Uchôa Rodrigues, 1893-1895	
 Raimundo Affonso de Carvalho, 1895-1897	
 Justiniano Serpa, 1897-1898	
 Hildebrando Luiz Antony, 1898-1899	
 Joaquim de Souza Ramos, 1899	
 Arthur Cesar Moreira de Araújo, 1899-1902	
 Adolpho Guilherme de Miranda Lisboa, 1902	
 João Coelho de Miranda Leão, 1902	
 Martinho de Luna Alencar, 1902-1903	
 Adolpho Guilherme de Miranda Lisboa, 1903-1904	
 João Coelho de Miranda Leão, 1904	
 Adolpho Guilherme de Miranda Lisboa, 1904-1907	
 José da Costa Monteiro Tapajós, 1907	
 Adolpho Delcidio do Amaral, 1907-1908	
 Domingos José de Andrade, 1908-1909	
 , 1909-1910	
 , 1910-11	
 Carlos Guilherme Gordon Studart, 1910
 , 1911-1914	
 Henrique Ferreira Penna de Azevedo, 1914	
 , 1914-1917	
 Antônio Ayres de Almeida Freitas, 1917-1920	
 Basílio Torreão Franco de Sá, 1920-1923	
 , 1923	
 Edgard de Rezende do Rego Monteiro, 1923-1924	
 Francisco das Chagas Aguiar, 1924	
 José Francisco de Araújo Lima, 1924	
 Gentil Augusto Bittencourt, 1924-1925	
 Hugo Carneiro, 1925-1926	
 José Francisco de Araújo Lima, 1926-1929	
 Sérgio Rodrigues Pessoa, 1929-1930	
 Joaquim Tanajura, 1930	
 Marciano Armond, 1930-1931	
 Emanuel de Moraes, 1931-1932	
 Luiz Caetano de Oliveira Cabral, 1932-1933	
 Alexandre de Carvalho Leal, 1933	
 Sócrates Bomfim	, 1933-1934	
 Pedro Severiano Nunes, 1934-1935	
 Alfredo de Lima Castro, 1935-1936	
 Jessé de Moura Pinto, 1936	
 Antônio Botelho Maia, 1936-1941	
 Adhmar de Andrade Thury, 1941-1942	
 Paulo de la Cruce de Grana Marinho, 1942-1943	
 Antóvila Mourão Vieira, 1943-1945	
 Francisco do Couto Vale, 1945	
 Jayme Bitancourt de Araújo, 1945-1946	
 Arnoldo Carpinteiro Péres, 1946	
 , 1946-1947 
 Raymundo Chaves Ribeiro, 1947-1951	
 Walter Scott da Silva Rayol, 1951	
 Edson Epaminondas de Mello, 1951-1952	
 Álvaro Symphronio Bandeira de Mello, 1952	
 Jessé de Moura Pinto, 1952	
 Oscar da Costa Rayol, 1952-1953	
 Aluízio Marques Brasil, 1953-1955	
 Raymundo Coqueiro Mendes, 1955	
 Walter Scott da Silva Rayol, 1955	
 Stenio Neves, 1955-1956	
 Gilberto Mestrinho, 1956-1958	
 Eurythis Pinto de Souza, 1958, 1959
 Ismael Benigno, 1958-1959 	
 Lóris Valdetaro Cordovil, 1959	
 Walter Scott da Silva Rayol, 1959	
 Olavo das Neves de Oliveira Melo, 1959-1960	
 Plínio Ramos Coelho, 1960	
 Walter Scott da Silva Rayol, 1960-1961	
 Lóris Valdetaro Cordovil, 1961-1962	
 , 1962-1964
 , 1964-1965 
 Vinicius Monte Conrado Gomes, 1965
 , 1965-1972	
 Frank Abrahim Lima, 1972-1975	
 , 1975-1979	
 José Fernandes, 1979-1982	
 João de Mendonça Furtado, 1982-1983	
 Amazonino Mendes, 1983-1986	
 Manoel Henriques Ribeiro, 1986-1988, 1988-1989	
 Alfredo Nascimento, 1988 
 Arthur Virgílio Neto, 1989-1993	
 Amazonino Mendes, 1993-1994
 Eduardo Braga, 1994-1997	
 Alfredo Nascimento, 1997-2004	
 , 2004-2005
 , 2005-2009
 Amazonino Mendes, 2009-2013
 Arthur Virgílio Neto, 2013-2020 
David Almeida, 2021-

See also
 
  (city council)
 Timeline of Manaus
 Amazonas history (state)
 List of mayors of largest cities in Brazil (in Portuguese)
 List of mayors of capitals of Brazil (in Portuguese)

References

This article incorporates information from the Portuguese Wikipedia.

manaus